The MR-73 (Matériel roulant conçu en 1973) is the second generation of rubber-tired rolling stock used on the Montreal Metro. Since the retirement of the first generation MR-63s, the MR-73 trains are in use on three of Montreal's four Metro lines.

Description 
In the early 1970s, the Commission de transport de la Communauté urbaine de Montréal (CTCUM), the predecessor of the STM, identified a need for more rolling stock to serve the crowds expected for the 1976 Summer Olympics and for future network expansions. Although the design of what was to later become the MR-73 was completed in 1973, it was only in 1974 that the CTCUM formally awarded the MR-73 contract to the fledgling Bombardier Transportation. The 423 MR-73 cars were manufactured at Bombardier's La Pocatière plant between 1974 and 1980 and the first units entered service in 1976. The MR-73's original interior featured orange-and-white seats arranged so that in each third of the train, there were two double sets of transverse seating and four single seats near the doors in longitudinal formation, which were removed during the 2005-2008 refurbishments, and the seating arrangement was later modified.

The MR-73 cars can be identified by rectangular cab headlights, side vents, blue and dark orange interiors, and  traction motors that growl while accelerating, producing a unique three-note sound signature when the train pulls out of a station. The three-note sound is produced by chopper traction motor control equipment, which controls and powers the motors on the train in stages without incurring a power surge. It does so by modulating the current in five consecutive stages (90, 120, 180, 240 and 360 Hz), of which the first two are barely audible over the other noise (fans, wheels) of the metro, but the last three clearly audible. 
The notes of the propulsion are the same as the first three notes of Aaron Copland's "Fanfare for the Common Man", one of the musical themes for Expo 67, but that is apparently just a coincidence. The notes were so remarkable, that in 2010 these notes were chosen as the door closing sound for the Montréal Metro and as brand sound for the entire STM.

A prototype for the current chopper was built by the Canron company using a Jeumont original design in the early 1970s on an MR-63 train. Until the retirement of the MR–63s in 2018, one of the three elements of the "Jeumont Train" were operated on the Green Line among rheostatic-started MR-63s; one of these was much louder than the other. They are the only two to exhibit the whole five-note audible signature in normal operation even though it is possible to hear them during longer-than-usual starts on regular MR-73s.

Some MR-73s originally sported murals of Montreal at the end of the cars; however, they were damaged by vandalism and removed long ago.

The MR-73 has a different electrical braking system from the MR-63 to assist friction braking. The MR-73's current chopper recuperates energy when in braking mode, turning traction motors into generators and sending a regulated current back into the traction power supply for other trains to use. Electrical braking is most effective when one train draws power while it is starting, and another train at a different location sends power while it is braking.

The Mean Distance Between Failures (MDBF) for the MR-73 exceeds  in 2004.

Retirement 
The STM noted in 2014 that they planned for the fleet to remain in service until at least 2036. , the oldest MR-73 cars are 46 years old. The less reliable cars have been retired, with 63 cars removed from June 2021 to make room for the MPM-10 Azur.

In June 2021 the first car of the series, 79-501, was returned to the La Pocatière plant, now owned by Bombarider's successor Alstom.

In 2022, STM announced they planned to replace the trains in the 2030s, with work underway to purchase new trains. This was estimated to cost around $2.9bn.

Lines serviced 

 Green Line (1976–1985, 2016–)

 Orange Line (1976–2019)

 Yellow Line (1976–2008, 2017–)

 Blue Line (1986–)

Formation (As of December 2021)

Modifications and refurbishments

Automated announcements and visual information
In the early 1990s, Alstom Télécité LED visual information screens were added on top of alternating side windows in all MR-73 cars. Advertisements were displayed, along with information on the weather and upcoming stations. Around the same time, automated next-station announcements were introduced on the MR-73 and voiced by Judith Ouimet.

Interior refurbishment
From December 2005 to 2008, the MR-73 fleet underwent a $40 million refurbishment to reconfigure interior seating to increase total car capacity and install new poles and new panels with a new ergonomic colour scheme that discouraged vandalism, decreased motion sickness, and promoted aesthetic harmony. Seating capacity was reduced by six per carriage. The refurbishment also include an ergonomic full-spectrum lighting system that provides therapeutic anti-depression effects for its passengers. Like the older MR-63 fleet, the MR-73 driver cabs will be modernized and equipped with ergonomic features and digital dashboards.

Closing doors chime
In 2006, an MR-73 train was tested with a four-beep door chime, and in 2008, another high-pitched chime was tested. However, the new chimes were unpopular and so in 2010, a three-note sequence that is essentially the same as the first three notes of "Fanfare for the Common Man" was tested but with a voiceover by Michèle Deslauriers saying Attention, nous fermons les portes (Attention, we are closing the doors) after the three-note sound was played. The voiceover was soon removed, however, and since 2012, the MR-73s play the three-note sequence whenever the doors are about to close replicating from the sound taken from when the train departs the station.

References 

Bombardier Transportation multiple units
Montreal Metro
Train-related introductions in 1976
Electric multiple units of Canada
750 V DC multiple units